This is the discography of Northern Irish singer Van Morrison.

Morrison made his first recording playing saxophone on "Boozoo Hully Gully" with the International Monarchs in 1962. His first recording session as lead singer/songwriter with Them was produced by Dick Rowe at Decca's studio. "Don't Start Crying Now" was the first single released and the garage rock classic, "Gloria" was also recorded at this session.  "Baby, Please Don't Go" (recorded October 1964) was released November 1964 with "Gloria" as the B-side and was a Top Ten hit in the UK Singles Chart. "Here Comes the Night" was Them's second hit in 1965, charting at No. 2 in the UK and No. 24 in the US.

Morrison had his first recording session as a solo artist for Bang Records in New York City for Bert Berns on 28 March 1967. One of the songs was "Brown Eyed Girl", which charted at No. 10 on the Billboard Hot 100. By April 2008, he had been on the Billboard album chart a total of 787 weeks.

Studio albums

1960s

1970s

1980s

1990s

2000s

2010s

2020s

Live albums

Singles

1960s

1970s

1980s

1990s

2000–present

Other appearances

Compilations
Selected charted discography

Remix albums

Unauthorised compilations 
 T.B. Sheets (1973)
 This Is Where I Came In (1982)
 Bang Masters (1991)
 Payin' Dues (1994)
 The Complete New York Sessions '67 (1997)
 The Complete Bang Sessions (2002)

Video albums

Session work

Performance

Production

Other documented performances
 The Last Waltz (1978)
 The Wall Concert in Berlin (1990)
 One Irish Rover BBC2 Arena TV (1991)
 Austin City Limits: Van Morrison PBS-TV episode (2006)

See also

Footnotes

References

External links
 DeWitt, Howard A. (1983). Van Morrison: The Mystic's Music, Horizon Books, 
 Turner, Steve (1993). Van Morrison: Too Late to Stop Now, Viking Penguin, 
 [ Van Morrison>Charts & Awards] AllMusic
 [ Van Morrison:Chart History] Billboard 200 Albums
 Album artist #31 Van Morrison charts: including UK
  UK chart stats: Van Morrison
 [ Van Morrison:Chart History] billboard.com Singles
 RIAA Gold and Platinum search results: Van Morrison Riaa.com, 2008-08-13
 

Discography
Discographies of Irish artists
Rock music discographies
Jazz discographies
Rhythm and blues discographies
Blues discographies
Folk music discographies
Discographies of British artists